1,4,2-Dithiazole is a heterocyclic compound consisting of an unsaturated five-membered ring containing two carbon atoms, one nitrogen atom, and two sulfur atoms. 1,4,2-Dithiazole compounds may be formed by the reaction of nitrile sulfide (formed by the thermolysis of oxathiazolone) with various reactive species; for instance thiocarbonyls via a 1,3-dipolar cycloaddition reaction. These compounds may be protonated by strong acids to give synthetically useful aromatic cations.

References

Nitrogen heterocycles
Sulfur heterocycles
Sulfur–nitrogen compounds